The following is a list of recorded songs by American rock band Marilyn Manson.

Manson